The 1954–55 season was Port Vale's 43rd season of football in the English Football League, and their first season (thirtieth overall) back in the Second Division following their promotion from the Third Division North. The club adapted well to their first second tier campaign since 1935–36, finishing in seventeenth place.

The season saw two club attendance records broken, with a highest average home attendance of 20,708 and the highest Football League attendance at Vale Park, when on 25 April 40,066 turned up for their encounter against Stoke City. It was the first season the two rival clubs met in the same league since 1932–33.

Overview

Second Division
The pre-season saw the players taken on a short outing to Ireland for their exploits the previous season. No major signings took place, and no players of note departed in the summer. Chairman Fred Burgess boasted of his team's loyalty.

The season opened with a 1–0 defeat at The Memorial Stadium to Bristol Rovers, though the team put in 'an encouraging display'. Two days later Vale Park welcomed a crowd of 26,805 for a 1–1 draw with Notts County. When they travelled to the Victoria Ground on 4 September, Stoke City had a 100% win record, but 46,777 locals witnessed a goalless draw between the Potteries clubs. Twelve days later Vale travelled to Vetch Field, where they lost 7–1 to Swansea Town, a team they had beaten 1–0 just ten days earlier. This occurred because Tommy Cheadle and Stan Turner had to leave the game before half-time with injuries. The heavy defeat seemed to have destroyed the reputation of 'the Steele Curtain', as the team would have to wait another fourteen matches before holding a clean sheet. During this time manager Freddie Steele switched tactics from a defensive set-up to 'a semi-continental style' in the hunt for goals. Five straight losses followed, as the players struggled to adapt. Also lost was their record of 42 home games without a loss when on 18 September 1954, Blackburn Rovers claimed a 3–0 victory. Basil Hayward dropped from the first eleven, they failed to beat strugglers Ipswich Town as the club hovered above the relegation zone. A win at the City Ground sustained them until two home wins came in late-December. In December Cyril Done, an experienced striker was signed from Tranmere Rovers for a four-figure fee.

On 5 February, strugglers Derby County thrashed the Vale 6–1 at the Baseball Ground, though the Vale's poor away record failed to deter a strong contingent of Vale fans from following the club around the country dressed in fancy dress. The following month aggressive young forward Len Stephenson was signed from Blackpool, and he impressed with his performances. Three defeats left the Vale in a relegation dogfight, but seven points from the first five games in April proved very useful. On 8 April, Done put four past his former club Liverpool in a 4–3 win. Three days later he scored a penalty at Anfield to earn a 1–1 draw. On 25 April, more than 40,000 turned up to Vale Park to witness the "Potters" claim a 1–0 victory. Vale won their final two games, including a 1–0 win over Rotherham United that denied the "Millers" a place in the top-flight.

They finished in seventeenth place, seven points clear of relegation, but nineteen short of promotion. With 48 goals, only Hull City scored fewer goals. Cyril Done was the only consistent scorer, and was the top scorer for both Vale and Tranmere, having scored twice as many league goals as the next highest scorer at both clubs.

Finances
On the financial side, a scant profit of £141 was recorded despite a club-record average home attendance of 20,708. The £6,850 spent to bolster the forward line had swallowed up most of the profits. The Supporters' Club therefore announced it would raise £5,000 – £1,500 of which would go towards the terracing on the Bycars End. Reserve players Mick Hulligan and Len Barber were allowed to leave for Northwich Victoria on free transfers.

Cup competitions
In the FA Cup, the "Valiants" drew 2–2 with West Ham United at Upton Park after going two goals behind. Vale won the replay 3–1 and were drawn against First Division Tottenham Hotspur at White Hart Lane in the Fourth Round. A crowd of 50,684 saw an exciting game in which a Ken Griffiths brace was wiped out by four "Spurs" goals.

League table

Results
Port Vale's score comes first

Football League Second Division

Results by matchday

Matches

FA Cup

Player statistics

Appearances

Top scorers

Transfers

Transfers in

Transfers out

References
Specific

General

Port Vale F.C. seasons
Port Vale